Campneuseville is a commune in the Seine-Maritime department in the Normandy region in northern France.

Geography

Population

Places of interest
 The church of Notre-Dame, dating from the sixteenth century.
 A seventeenth century manorhouse.

See also
Communes of the Seine-Maritime department
Monchy-le-Preux, a former commune that was joined to Campneuseville in 1823.

References

Communes of Seine-Maritime